= Dover 200 =

Dover 200 has been the name of various NASCAR Xfinity Series and Camping World Truck Series races at Dover International Speedway:

- OneMain Financial 200 (spring) - The spring/early summer Xfinity race known as the Dover 200 in 2007
- Drive Sober 200 - The fall Xfinity race known as the Dover 200 from 2005 to 2006, from 2009 to 2010, and in 2014
- JEGS 200 - The spring/early summer Camping World Truck race known as the Dover 200 in 2010
